Jacob Creek is a stream in Alberta, Canada.

Jacob Creek has the name of a Stoney Indian tribal leader. Jacobs Creek is a waterway in Canada. It is located in the province of British Columbia, in the southern part of the country, 3 500 km west of the capital Ottawa. In the surroundings of Jacobs Creek, the coniferous forest mainly grows. Around Jacobs Creek, it is quite densely populated, with 222 inhabitants per square kilometre. The coastal climate prevails in the neighbourhood. The average annual temperature in the funnel is 7 °C. The warmest month is July, when the average temperature is 18 °C, and the coldest is December, at -3 °C. The average annual average is 2 469 mm. The rainy month is December, with an average rainfall of 324 mm, and the driest is August, with rainfall of 49 mm.

See also
List of rivers of Alberta

References

Rivers of Alberta